Hugo Graf Henckel von Donnersmarck (born April 26, 1811 in Siemianowitz, Upper Silesia (now in Poland), died October 4, 1890 in Vienna) was a German-Austrian entrepreneur.

Biography
He was born the only child of Count Karol Henckel von Donnersmarck and Eugenia Wengersky von Ungarschütz.

In 1832 he inherited his father's possessions in Bytom, Upper Silesia and began his involvement in agriculture, livestock, and heavy industry. He built  the first puddling and Steel rolling mill in Germany at Laurahiitte (Siemianowice Śląskie). In 1846 he inherited Henckel von Donnersmarck family possessions in Carinthia; in particular Wolfsberg and Bad Sankt Leonhard in Lavanttal. Here he reorganized the steel industry and moved it from Frantschach-Sankt Gertraud in the Wolfsberg district to Zeltweg in Styria, where he had a puddling and steel rolling mill soon built.

By 1871 the company Vereinigte Königs- und Laurahütte was a major part of its coal and steel industry in Upper Silesia. To compensate the town of Frantschach for the loss of its steel industry he set up a soda-pulp and paper mill in  1881/82, which is still called Mondi Packaging Frantschach GmbH which is still the largest employer in Frantschach.

He rebuilt Castle Wolfsberg in neo-Gothic Tudor style was renewed. 

He married twice first to Countess Laurą von Hardenberg (1812–1857), his second wife was Laurą von Kaszony (1836–1905) for whom he had the Palais Henckel von Donnersmarck in Vienna built as a gift in 1872.

His children were Hugo II (1832–1908), Łazarz IV (1835–1914), Artur (1836–1921), Laura (1838–1931) and Alfons (1840–1856).

See also
Henckel von Donnersmarck family line

References
Henckel von Donnersmarck, Hugo Katalog Der Deutschen Nationalbibliothek d-nb.info
 Hugo Reichsgraf Henckel Freiherr von Donnersmarck und die Geschichte seines Hauses, Wien (b.r.w.).
 Henckel von Donnersmarck Hugo, A. Perlick, w: Neue Deuitsche Biographie, Bd 8, Berlin 1969, s. 517
 Henckel von Donnersmarck Hugo, w: Österreichisches Biographisches Lexicon 1815-1950, Bd II, Graz-Köln 1959.
 Henckel von Donnersmarckowie. Kariera i fortuna rodu, A. Kuzio-Podrucki,  Bytom 2003,

External links
Schlosss Wolfsberg www.schloss-wolfsberg.at
Henckel von Donnesmarck family www.arekkp.pl

Hugo
1890 deaths
1811 births